Karan Kaila (born 8 September 1994) is an Indian cricketer who plays for Punjab. He made his List A debut on 10 December 2015 in the 2015–16 Vijay Hazare Trophy. He made his Twenty20 debut for Punjab in the 2018–19 Syed Mushtaq Ali Trophy on 27 February 2019. He made his first-class debut on 17 December 2019, for Punjab in the 2019–20 Ranji Trophy.

References

External links
 

1994 births
Living people
Indian cricketers
Punjab, India cricketers
Cricketers from Patiala